The Olenyok Gulf, also known as Olenek Bay, (Ölöön xomoto) is a broad gulf in the Laptev Sea. It is located WSW of the huge Lena Delta, which forms its eastern limit.

There are some islands in the gulf, like Salkay Island in the west and Dzhyangylakh and Eppet in the mouths of the Olenyok River that empties into this gulf.

The Olenyok Gulf belongs to the Sakha administrative division of the Russian Federation.

Ecology
Chars are common in the low-salinity waters of the Olenyok Gulf and genetic studies were conducted on them.

The flat shores of the bay are a natural habitat for birds such as waders.

See also
Vasili Pronchishchev
William Barr, The First Soviet Convoy to the Mouth of the Lena.

References

External links

Gulfs of the Laptev Sea
Bodies of water of the Sakha Republic
Gulfs of Russia